Sha'aba Lafiagi was elected governor of Kwara State in January 1992 on the Social Democratic Party (SDP) platform, and was removed from office by the administration of General Sani Abacha in November 1993.

As governor he initiated construction of new headquarters for the Kwara State Printing and Publishing Corporation, but they were not opened until 2002, and in 2010 were slated for demolition.

Political career
He was a protégé of Olusola Saraki, Senate Leader during the Nigerian Second Republic, who helped him become elected governor in December 1991. He was a member of the Committee for National Consensus (CNC) together with Olusola Saraki later he fell out with Saraki when it became apparent Saraki was backing Mohammed Lawal for Kwara governor in 1999. However, he remained a power in Kwara State politics.

Lafiagi became a member of the board of trustees of the People's Democratic Party (PDP).
In February 2009, he was appointed chairman of the National Sugar Development Council, a parastatal.
He led the planning committee for the 20 April 2009 Special National Convention of the PDP, recommending a budget of N400 million. Given the economic climate, President Umaru Yar'Adua slashed the budget to N100 million.

In April 2011, he was elected a senator representing Kwara North Senatorial District

References

Living people
Governors of Kwara State
Social Democratic Party (Nigeria) politicians
Peoples Democratic Party members of the Senate (Nigeria)
Year of birth missing (living people)
Politicians from Kwara State